Bonderman is a surname. Notable people with the surname include:

David Bonderman (born 1942), American businessman
Jeremy Bonderman (born 1982), American baseball player